George Alexander Bowman (born 27 June 1872 in Montrose) was a Scottish footballer, who played for Montrose, Third Lanark and Scotland.

References

Sources

External links

London Hearts profile

1872 births
Year of death missing
Scottish footballers
Scotland international footballers
Montrose F.C. players
Third Lanark A.C. players
People from Montrose, Angus
Association football fullbacks
Footballers from Angus, Scotland